CSF/serum albumin ratio is a test performed to compare the levels of albumin in the cerebrospinal fluid and the serum.

It is useful as a measure of the integrity of the blood–brain barrier.

References

Neurology
CSF tests